Attica Blues are a UK trip hop band, who made their debut releases on the Mo' Wax label. Taking their name from an Archie Shepp album, the band have also provided remixes for Ultra Naté, Sneaker Pimps, Silent Poets and DJ Krush.

History
The group began life in 1994 when producers D'Afro (aka Charlie Dark, born Charlie Williams) and Tony Nwachukwu first met up. D'Afro had previously founded London's Urban Poets Society collective but the duo later became Attica Blues. While trying to sell some Japanese hip-hop records, D'Afro met up with Mo'Wax founder James Lavelle and was offered a spot on his Mo'Wax label despite never having made music before.  The duo began recording their first single alone but when a local student, the Egyptian-born Roba El-Essawy, visited the studio during the recording for their debut single, D'Afro and Nwachukwu decided to ask her to join them. The band released their first single in 1995 and their debut album in 1997.

Roba was married to Turner-prize-winning artist Chris Ofili from 2002 to 2019.

Discography

Albums
Attica Blues (Mo' Wax, 1997)
Test. Don't Test (Columbia, 2000)
Attica Blues Present Drum Major Instinct (Ex:treme, 2001)

Singles
Vibes, Scribes 'N' Dusty 45's EP (Mo' Wax, 1994)
"Blueprint" (Mo' Wax, 1995)
"3ree (A Means to Be)" (Mo' Wax, 1997)
"Tender" (Mo' Wax, 1997)
"Oh La La La" (1998)
"What Do You Want?" (2000)

References

External links
 Charlie Dark on Andrew Meza's BTS Radio

Trip hop groups